is a district located in Nagasaki Prefecture, Japan.

As of January 1, 2009, the district has an estimated population of 39,012 and a density of 233 persons per km2. The total area is 167.47 km2.

Towns and villages
Hasami
Higashisonogi
Kawatana

Districts in Nagasaki Prefecture